The Last Vermeer is a 2019 American drama film directed by Dan Friedkin from a screenplay by John Orloff (under the pen name James McGee), Mark Fergus, and Hawk Ostby. It is based on the 2008 book The Man Who Made Vermeers by Jonathan Lopez, and tells the story of Han van Meegeren (played by Guy Pearce), an art maker who swindles millions of dollars from the Nazis, alongside Dutch Resistance fighter Joseph Piller (Claes Bang).

The film had its worldwide release at the Telluride Film Festival on August 31, 2019, and was theatrically released in the United States on November 20, 2020, by Sony Pictures Releasing.

Premise
The Last Vermeer follows "Dutch folk hero Han van Meegeren (Guy Pearce) who swindled millions of dollars from the art world including the Nazis by selling them forgeries of Johannes Vermeer paintings and is considered the most successful art forger of all time."

Cast
 Guy Pearce as Han van Meegeren
 Claes Bang as Captain Joseph Piller
 Vicky Krieps as Minna Holberg
 Roland Møller as Espen Dekker
 August Diehl as Alex De Klerks
 Olivia Grant as Cootje Henning
 Susannah Doyle as Johana
 Adrian Scarborough as Dirk Hannema

Production
On April 25, 2018, it was announced that Imperative Entertainment had begun production on Lyrebird, a film directed by Dan Friedkin and produced by Ridley Scott from a screenplay by James McGee, Mark Fergus and Hawk Ostby. The film is Friedkin's directorial debut.

Alongside the film's initial announcement, it was confirmed that Guy Pearce, Claes Bang, Vicky Krieps, and Roland Møller had been cast in film's lead roles. Principal photography for the film was underway by April 2018, taking place in the United Kingdom and Holland. On May 22, 2018, filming took place at Fort Widley in Portsmouth, England. In April and August 2018, filming took place in Dordrecht and Schiedam, Netherlands.

Release
The film had its world premiere at the Telluride Film Festival on August 31, 2019. It also screened at the Toronto International Film Festival on September 11, 2019. Prior to, Sony Pictures Classics acquired distribution rights to the film. It was scheduled to be released on May 22, 2020, but was pulled due to the COVID-19 pandemic. It was then released on November 20, 2020, with TriStar Pictures distributing instead of Sony Pictures Classics.

Reception

Box office 
The film made $1,225,000 from 1912 theaters in its opening weekend.

Critical response 
The website's critics consensus reads: "Led by a skilled performance from Guy Pearce, The Last Vermeer derives diverting drama from its historically inspired wartime story." On Metacritic, the film has a weighted average score of 56 out of 100, based on 15 critics, indicating "mixed or average reviews". Audiences polled by PostTrak gave the film an average 4 out of 5 stars.

References

External links
 
 

2019 films
2019 directorial debut films
American drama films
American films based on actual events
2019 drama films
Films based on non-fiction books
Films postponed due to the COVID-19 pandemic
Films shot in Hampshire
Films shot in the Netherlands
TriStar Pictures films
2010s English-language films
2010s American films
Films about art forgery